Janeiro J Tucker (born 15 March 1975) is a Bermudian cricketer, who captained the Bermudian cricket team in their first ever One Day International when they played Canada on 17 May 2006; Tucker took 2/29 off nine overs and scored 17 as Bermuda won the game by three wickets under the Duckworth-Lewis method. He has since gone on to play in twenty six ODIs for Bermuda.

Tucker's first top-level domestic cricket came in 1996-97, when he played for Bermuda against the Windward Islands in the List A Shell/Sandals Trophy, taking 1-45 and scoring 3. He played on and off for the next four seasons, but after the 2000-01 Red Stripe Bowl Bermuda ceased to play at List A level in West Indian domestic cricket. Janeiro selected for ICC T20 World Cup qualifier which is going to be held in Dubai.

Tucker played a full part in Bermuda's 2005 ICC Trophy campaign in July of that year, as they claimed third place in the competition, averaging 46.40 with the bat and scoring 132 against the USA at The Lawn, Waringstown, as well as taking seven wickets. The following month he made a hundred on his first-class debut, scoring 123 in the second innings against Canada in the ICC Intercontinental Cup.

He was selected as part of Bermuda's squad for the World Twenty20 Qualifier.

His father, John, played many times in the ICC Trophy for Bermuda, and took part in the final of the 1982 tournament against Zimbabwe.

In April 2018, he was named in Bermuda's squad for the 2018 ICC World Cricket League Division Four tournament in Malaysia. In September 2019, he was named in Bermuda's squad for the 2019 ICC T20 World Cup Qualifier tournament in the United Arab Emirates. He made his Twenty20 International (T20I) debut for Bermuda, against Papua New Guinea, on 19 October 2019.

References

External links
 

1975 births
Living people
Bermudian cricketers
Bermuda One Day International cricketers
Bermuda Twenty20 International cricketers
Bermuda cricket captains